List of colleges and universities in Georgia (U.S. state)
List of universities in Georgia (country)